Achthophora alma is a species of beetle in the family Cerambycidae. It was described by Newman in 1842.

References

Lamiini
Beetles described in 1842